This is a list of prominent Punjabi people from the United Kingdom who may follow a variety of beliefs including Sikhism, Hinduism, Islam, Christianity or atheism.

Academia and education 
 Harminder Dua – discovered a previously unknown layer lurking in the human eye named the "dua's layer".
Humayon Dar – director general of Islamic Research & Training Institute (IRTI)
 Jagjit Chadha – professor and chair in Money and Banking in the Department of Economics at the University of Kent
Kalwant Bhopal – Professor of Education and Social Justice and Deputy Director of the Centre for Research in Race & Education at the University of Birmingham
 Max Arthur Macauliffe (1841–1913) – senior administrator of the British Raj who was posted in the Punjab; prolific scholar and author; converted to Sikhism in the 1860s
 Peter Bance – historian, author and Maharaja Duleep Singh archivist
 Simon Singh – mathematician and author
 Sukhbir Singh Kapoor – vice chancellor of The International School of Sikh Studies and Khalsa College London
 Tejinder Virdee – experimental particle physicist and professor of physics at Imperial College London

Business and the professions 

 Avtar Lit – former owner and chairman of Sunrise Radio Group
Emran Mian – author and civil servant
Aneel Mussarat – ranked the 466th richest person in the United Kingdom and 21st richest Asian in the UK in 2007 by the Sunday Times
Sir Anwar Pervez – founder and chairman of Bestway
 Dabinderjit Singh – director at the National Audit Office
Gulu Lalvani – founder and chairman of Binatone
Hasnat Khan – heart and lung surgeon; he was in a romantic relationship with Diana, Princess of Wales
James Caan – entrepreneur and Dragon's Den personality 
 Jasminder Singh – chairman of the Radisson Edwardian hotel empire
Jaz Rai – aerospace engineer and chairman of the Sikh Recovery Network
 Kamel Hothi – former banker at Lloyds Bank
 Karamjit Singh – chair of the University Hospitals of Leicester NHS Trust
 Kulveer Ranger – management consultant; former London Transport Minister and Mayor's Director of Environment and Digital London
Mo Chaudry – chairman of WaterWorld aqua park
Mohammad Naseem – GP
Osama Saeed – Scottish communications professional
Param Singh – business professional and entrepreneur
 Rami Ranger – founder of Sun Mark, an international marketing and distribution company
 Ranjit Singh Boparan – founder and owner of 2 Sisters Food Group
 Reuben Singh – CEO of contact centre company alldayPA
Reena Ranger – director at Sun Mark and founder of Women Empowered Network
 Simon Arora – billionaire businessman, CEO of the retail chain B & M
 Surinder Arora – hotelier
 Tom Singh – founder of the high street fashion chain New Look
Zameer Choudrey

Charity, community and non-profit 

 Balwant Kaur – founder and chairperson of Mata Nanki Foundation
 Daljit Singh Shergill – president of Guru Nanak Gurdwara Smethwick
 Harpal Kumar – chief executive of Cancer Research UK
 Imandeep Kaur – director of Impact Hub: Birmingham
 Mohinder Singh Ahluwalia (Bhai Sahib) – chairman of the Nishkam Group
 Nidar Singh Nihang – scholar and grandmaster of Shastar Vidya
 Ravi Singh – CEO of Khalsa Aid

Film, drama and entertainment 
 Abdullah Afzal – comedian
 Adeel Akhtar – actor
 Ameet Chana – actor
 Amrit Maghera – professional model turned actress
 Archie Renaux – actor and model
 Art Malik – actor 
 Chandeep Uppal – actor, best known for her critically acclaimed starring role as Meena Kumar in the film Anita and Me.
 Danny Bhoy – comedian
 Gurinder Chadha – film director
 Guz Khan – comedian
 Harnaam Kaur – model, anti-bullying activist, body positive activist
 Humza Arshad – comedian
 Jas Binag – actor/model
 Jassa Ahluwalia – actor and presenter
 Jay Shareef – comedian
 Jimi Mistry – actor
 Kulvinder Ghir – actor, comedian and writer
 Lena Kaur – actor, best known for her role as Leila Roy in Channel 4
 Mandy Takhar – actor
 Meera Syal – comedian
 Neelam Gill – known for her work with Burberry, Abercrombie & Fitch and appearing in Vogue
 Nitin Kundra – actor 
 Nitin Sawhney – musician, producer and composer
 Paul Chowdhry – comedian and actor
 Parminder Nagra – actor
 Parvez Qadir – actor
 Perry Bhandal – film director, screenwriter
 Saeed Jaffrey – actor
 Sair Khan – actor
 Saira Choudhry – actor
 Saira Khan – television presenter 
 Samir Bhamra – playwright, designer, producer, director
 Sanjeev Bhaskar – comedian
 Sanjeev Kohli – comedian
 Shabana Bakhsh – actor
 Simon Rivers – English actor who played the role of Kevin Tyler in Doctors
 Stephen Uppal – actor, known for playing Ravi Roy in the long-running British soap Hollyoaks
 Tahirah Sharif – actor
 Zia Mohyeddin – actor

Law and justice 

 Anup Singh Choudry – retired High Court judge
 Bobbie Cheema-Grubb (The Hon. Mrs Justice Cheema-Grubb) – judge of the Queen's Bench Division of the High Court of Justice of England and Wales
 Jasvir Singh – family law barrister
 Jo Sidhu QC – criminal law barrister
 Mota Singh QC – retired circuit judge England
Nazir Afzal – lawyer
 Rabinder Singh (The Rt. Hon. Lord Justice) – English Court of Appeal judge, formerly a High Court judge of the Queen's Bench Division
Tarique Ghaffur – former high ranking police officer

Journalism, writers, creatives and media 

 Aatish Taseer – writer-journalist, son of Indian journalist Tavleen Singh
Adil Ray – actor, comedian and radio and television presenter
Atta Yaqub – model
 Anita Rani – radio and television presenter
Chila Kumari Burman – artist
 Bobby Friction – DJ, television presenter and radio presenter
 Daljit Nagra – poet
 Gurpreet Kaur Bhatti – writer
 Hardeep Singh Kohli – radio and television presenter
Hassan Ghani – Scottish broadcast journalist
Imtiaz Dharke – poet, artist and documentary filmmaker
Martin Bashir – journalist
Mishal Husain – British news presenter
Mo Dutta – television and radio presenter
Mohsin Hamid – novelist, writer and brand consultant
Moniza Alvi – poet and writer
 Nirpal Singh Dhaliwal – journalist and writer
Omar Mansoor – designer
 Priya Kaur-Jones – newsreader
Qaisra Shahraz – novelist, scriptwriter, college inspector, teacher trainer, education consultant
Raman Mundair – poet, writer, artist and playwright
 Ranvir Singh – English television presenter and journalist
Razia Iqbal – journalist employed by BBC News
Rizwan Khan – broadcaster
Sangita Myska – television presenter and journalist
Sarfraz Manzoor – journalist, documentary maker, and broadcaster
 Sathnam Sanghera – British journalist and author
 Sonia Deol – English radio and television presenter
 Sunny Hundal – journalist, blogger and academic
Sunny and Shay – husband and wife radio presenters 
Tariq Ali – writer, journalist
Ziauddin Sardar – scholar, award-winning writer, cultural critic

Music 

 Aman Hayer – bhangra producer and singer
 Bally Sagoo – record producer
 Channi Singh – bhangra musician, known as the "godfather" of bhangra in the West
 Diamond Duggal – music producer, DJ, songwriter and guitarist
 Dr Zeus – Punjabi singer and music producer
 Gurdeep Samra – music producer and DJ
 Hard Kaur – rapper and hip hop singer
 Indy Sagu – bhangra and hip hop musician
 Jas Mann – songwriter, musician, singer, record producer and film producer
 Jassi Sidhu – bhangra singer and the former lead singer of British Indian bhangra band B21
 Jay Sean – R&B artist
 Juggy D – bhangra, Punjabi music, R&B
 Malkit Singh – Punjabi bhangra]] singer
 Manj Musik – music composer, singer
 Manni Sandhu – music director
Ms Scandalous – bhangra/rap artist
 Naughty Boy – rapper, musician and DJ
 Panjabi MC – rapper, musician and DJ
 Rishi Rich – music producer
 Silinder Pardesi – bhangra singer-songwriter, lyricist, and composer
 Sukshinder Shinda – bhangra record producer and singer–songwriter
 Prof Surinder Singh Matharu – founder of the Raj Academy Conservatoire
 Surjit Khan – record producer, musician and singer-songwriter
 Tarsame Singh Saini – singer, composer and actor
 Talvin Singh – producer, composer and tabla player
 Tigerstyle – folkhop group
 Tjinder Singh – lead singer of British indie rock band Cornershop
 Zack Knight – singer-songwriter, music composer and producer

Politics 

Atma Singh – policy advisor to the Mayor of London on Asian Affairs in the Greater London Authority, under Ken Livingstone
Afzal Khan – British Labour Party politician who serves as a member of parliament for the Manchester Gorton constituency
Anas Sarwar – Scottish Labour Party politician
Bashir Ahmad – SNP Politician
Bashir Khanbhai – former MEP for East of England and Conservative Party politician.
Bashir Maan – Pakistani-Scottish politician, businessman, judge, community worker and writer
Diljit Rana – member of the House of Lords
Gurinder Josan – Labour party activist
Hanzala Malik – Scottish Labour Party politician
Humza Yousaf – SNP politician
Hardyal Dhindsa – Derbyshire police and crime commissioner
 Indarjit Singh (The Lord Singh of Wimbledon CBE) – member of House of Lords
 Marsha Singh – British Labour Party politician, Member of Parliament (MP) for Bradford West from 1997 to 2012
Mohammad Sarwar – former Pakistani Senator
 Neena Gill – Member of the European Parliament for the West Midlands
Nosheena Mobarik – life peer
 Onkar Sahota – Member of the London Assembly for Ealing and Hillingdon
 Parmjit Dhanda – British Labour Party politician, Member of Parliament (MP) for Gloucester from 2001 until the 2010 general election
 Parmjit Singh Gill – Member of Parliament for Leicester South from July 2004 to May 2005, he was the first ethnic-minority Liberal Democrat MP
 Paul Uppal – small business commissioner
 Piara Khabra – Labour Member of Parliament (MP) for Ealing Southall from 1992 until his death
 Preet Gill – Member of Parliament (MP) for Birmingham Edgbaston since the 2017 general election, first female British Sikh MP.
 Ranbir Singh Suri, Baron Suri – member of the House of Lords
Sajid Javid – current Home Secretary for the UK
Seema Malhotra – Labour MP for Feltham
Shas Sheehan – life peer
 Sonika Nirwal – senior Ealing Southall constituency Labour politician representing the Greenford Broadway ward
 Tanmanjeet Singh Dhesi – British Labour Party politician, MP for Slough since 2017
Virendra Sharma – Labour Party politician
Yasmin Qureshi – Labour Party politician 
Zahida Manzoor – Conservative member of the House of Lords

Royalty and revolutionaries 
 Frederick Duleep Singh – younger son of Duleep Singh, the last Maharaja of the Sikh Empire
 Maharaja Duleep Singh – last Maharaja of the Sikh Kingdom, exiled in 1849 during the British Raj and possibly the first permanent Sikh resident in England
 Princess Sophia Alexandra Duleep Singh – prominent suffragette and accredited nurse
 Udham Singh – Punjab revolutionary and freedom fighter belonging to the Ghadar Party

Sports 

Ajmal Shahzad – cricketer
Akaash Bhatia – boxer
 Aman Dosanj – first British South Asian footballer to represent England at any level (under-16)
Amir Khan – boxer
Arjan Raikhy - footballer
Asim Butt – cricketer
 Danny Batth – footballer and captain of Wolverhampton Wanderers F.C.
 Fauja Singh – British Sikh centenarian marathon runner
 Harpal Singh – footballer
Imran Jamshed – cricketer
Imran Majid – pool player
Kabir Ali – cricketer
Kadeer Ali – cricketer
Kamran Afzaal – cricketer
 Kash Gill – former kickboxing world champion
 Michael Chopra – footballer
Mohammad Akhtar – cricketer
 Monty Panesar – England cricketer
 Ravi Bopara – England cricketer
Saqlain Mushtaq – cricketer
Shaftab Khalid – cricketer
Usman Afzaal – cricketer
Zafar Ansari – cricketer
Zesh Rehman – footballer

Causes célèbres 
 Jagtar Singh Johal
 Lakhvir Kaur Singh

See also 
British Punjabis
Punjabi diaspora
British Indians
List of British Sikhs

Punjabi people
Lists of British people by origin